The women's 100 metre backstroke S7 event at the 2016 Paralympic Games took place on 8 September 2016, at the Olympic Aquatics Stadium. Two heats were held. The swimmers with the eight fastest times advanced to the final. Two heats were held, each with seven swimmers. The swimmers with the eight fastest times advanced to the final.

Records
Prior to the competition, the World and Paralympic records were:

Heats

Heat 1 
12:04 8 September 2016:

Heat 2 
12:08 8 September 2016:

Final 
20:39 8 September 2016:

Notes

Swimming at the 2016 Summer Paralympics